Orthaga leucolophota is a species of snout moth in the genus Orthaga. It is found in New Guinea.

References

Moths described in 1916
Epipaschiinae